The 2008 Victorian Premier League (also known as the 2008 Foxtel Cup for sponsorship reasons) is the 97th season of top-tier football in Victoria. It began on 15 February 2008 and ended on 21 September 2008. Preston Lions was the defending champion.

Teams

Standings

Finals series

Top goalscorers

References
ozfootball - 2008 Victorian Premier League results
ozfootball - 2008 Victorian Premier League table

External links
 Football Federation Victoria

Victorian Premier League, 2008
2008
2008 domestic association football leagues